Andrew Hjulsager (born 15 January 1995) is a Danish professional footballer who plays for Belgian club Gent as an attacking midfielder.

Career

Brøndby IF
On 25 October 2012, Hjulsager signed a two-year extension to his contract which tying him to the club until summer 2015.

Hjulsager made his debut at the age of 18, starting as a right winger in the first match of the season, a 1–1 home draw against FC Vestsjælland on 21 July 2013. He crowned his debut with a goal which made him the second youngest goalscorer in the history of Brøndby IF.

On 22 August 2013, Hjulsager signed a new four-year contract until summer 2017. He ended season 2013–14 with 23 appearances and four goals despite the fact that he formally belonged to Brøndby IF’s under-19 squad. His performance made UEFA named him the Danish league "One to Watch" in the annual Danish season review due to his impressive ability to read the game combined with his superior technique, incredible pace and offensive mindset.

Hjulsager started the season with a slot among the starting eleven in a 9–0 home victory against the San Marino side Juvenes/Dogana in the UEFA Europa League qualification.

Celta
On 31 January 2017, Hjulsager signed a three-and-a-half-year contract with La Liga side Celta de Vigo.

On 31 January 2018, Hjulsager was loaned to Segunda División side Granada CF until the end of the season.

Oostende
On 12 July 2019, it was confirmed that Belgium side Oostende has secured the signing of Andrew Hjulsager from Celta Vigo. The Spanish club reserved a right to a percentage of any future sale of the player.

Career statistics

(-) Not qualified

Honours

Individual
Andrew Hjulsager was rewarded under-19 talent of the year 2013 by the Danish Football Association

References

External links
 
 Andrew Hjulsager DBU-statistics
 

1995 births
People from Amager
Living people
Danish men's footballers
Association football midfielders
Denmark youth international footballers
Denmark under-21 international footballers
Brøndby IF players
RC Celta de Vigo players
Granada CF footballers
K.V. Oostende players
K.A.A. Gent players
Danish Superliga players
La Liga players
Segunda División players
Belgian Pro League players
Danish expatriate men's footballers
Expatriate footballers in Spain
Danish expatriate sportspeople in Spain
Expatriate footballers in Belgium
Danish expatriate sportspeople in Belgium